José Santos Arias González (22 January 1928 – 4 September 2012), known as José Santos Arias, was a Chilean football player who played as a forward and manager.

Career
Arias joined Colo-Colo after taking part in a championship in the Estadio Nacional as a member of the team of normal school from Victoria city. As a player of Colo-Colo, he made fifty-three appearances and scored nine goals in the Chilean top division from 1950 to 1952.

In 1953, he switched to the traditional rival, Universidad de Chile, becoming the fifth player to make it directly after Alfonso Domínguez, Pedro Hugo López, Jorge Peñaloza and Javier Mascaró. For them, he made twenty-seven appearances and scored four goals at league level.

His last club was Green Cross in 1955.

Coaching career
Considered a Fernando Riera's disciple, at youth level he worked for clubs such as Green Cross, with whom he began his career, Colo-Colo, Filanbanco, Deportes La Serena, among others. He also coached the Chile under-20 team at both the 1967 and the 1974 South American Championships.

In the top division, he led Rangers (1968), Audax Italiano (1971), Colo-Colo as interim (1974), Santiago Morning (1978–79) and Deportes La Serena (1990–91). He also won the Cuarta División in 1984 and got the promotion to the Tercera División with Soinca Bata.

In 1973, he coached the Chile national amateur team with views to the 1975 Pan American Games, previous to the Chilean coup d'état.

As a football teacher, he was one of the founders of the Football Managers Association of Chile and gave classes alongside colleagues such as Pedro Morales and Eddio Inostroza.

Personal life
He graduated as a teacher at the normal school of Victoria, where he coincided with Constantino Mohor and Caupolicán Peña, who were footballers and managers later.

Honours
Soinca Bata
 Cuarta División: 1984

References

External links
 

1928 births
2012 deaths
People from Bío Bío Province
Chilean footballers
Chilean Primera División players
Colo-Colo footballers
Universidad de Chile footballers
Club de Deportes Green Cross footballers
Association football forwards
Chilean football managers
Chilean expatriate football managers
Chilean expatriate sportspeople in Ecuador
Expatriate football managers in Ecuador
Chile national under-20 football team managers
Chile national football team managers
Primera B de Chile managers
Chilean Primera División managers
Rangers de Talca managers
Audax Italiano managers
Colo-Colo managers
Santiago Morning managers
Deportes La Serena managers
Deportes Melipilla managers